Hans Keiter (22 March 1910 – 8 September 2005) was a German field handball player who competed in the 1936 Summer Olympics. He was part of the German field handball team, which won the gold medal. He played two matches.

External links
Hans Keiter's profile at databaseOlympics
Hans Keiter's profile at Sports Reference.com

1910 births
2005 deaths
Field handball players at the 1936 Summer Olympics
German male handball players
Olympic gold medalists for Germany
Olympic handball players of Germany
Olympic medalists in handball
Medalists at the 1936 Summer Olympics